Arroyo Barril International Airport  is an airport  west of Samaná, the capital of Samaná Province in the Dominican Republic. The airport is on the southern shore of the Samaná Peninsula, facing Samaná Bay to the south.

There are tall hills immediately north of the runway. Approach and departure are over the water. The runway length includes a  displaced threshold on Runway 11.

Airlines and destinations

See also
Transport in Dominican Republic
List of airports in Dominican Republic

References

External links 

OpenStreetMap - Arroyo Barril Airport
SkyVector - Arroyo Barril Airport
OurAirports - Arroyo Barril Airport

 FlightAware live flight tracker for MDAB: Arroyo Barril Int'l Airport (Samana)

Airports in the Dominican Republic
Buildings and structures in Samaná Province